Fredrik Nordkvelle (born 13 September 1985) is a Norwegian footballer who plays as a midfielder for Urædd.

Career
Nordkvelle hails from Porsgrunn. He joined Strømsgodset during the 2007 season after impressing coach Dag-Eilev Fagermo whilst on trial at Marienlyst. In 2008 Nordkvelle's superb solo strike in the league match away at Aalesund was voted as goal of the season by TV 2 viewers.

On 30 August 2011, Nordkvelle signed a contract with Brann where he will play from the beginning of the 2012 season.

On 11 August 2013 Odd confirmed that they had signed Nordkvelle just 15 minutes before the transferwindow closed. Nordkvelle signed a contract that will keep him in Skien for 4,5 years.

Career statistics

Club

References

External links 
 Fredrik Nordkvelle at Godset.no
 

1985 births
Living people
Sportspeople from Porsgrunn
Norwegian footballers
Pors Grenland players
Strømsgodset Toppfotball players
SK Brann players
Odds BK players
Norwegian First Division players
Eliteserien players
Association football midfielders